Francis Bernard Beamish (5 April 1802 – 1 February 1868) was an Irish Whig and Liberal politician.

Beamish was the son of William Beamish and Anne Jane Margaret (née Delacour) and, in 1837, married Catherine Savery de Lisle de Courcy, daughter of Michael de Courcy and Catherine de Lisle. They had at least one child: Francis Bernard Servington Beamish, who was born in 1839.

A Freeman of Cork in 1827, Beamish was made Mayor of Cork in 1843, and High Sheriff of the City of Cork in 1852, and was also a Deputy Lieutenant and Justice of the Peace.

Beamish was elected as a Whig Member of Parliament (MP) for Cork City at the 1837 general election and held the seat until 1841, when he did not stand for re-election. He returned to the seat, again as a Whig, at a by-election in 1853—caused by the appointment of Francis Murphy as a Commissioner of Insolvency—and, becoming a Liberal in 1859, held the seat until 1865, when he did not seek re-election.

References

External links
 

Whig (British political party) MPs for Irish constituencies
Irish Liberal Party MPs
UK MPs 1847–1852
1802 births
1868 deaths
Lord Mayors of Cork
Sheriffs of Cork (city)
Irish justices of the peace
Deputy Lieutenants in Ireland
Members of the Parliament of the United Kingdom for County Cork constituencies (1801–1922)